Naye is a town in Senegal on the border with Mali

Transport 

It is served by a station on the Dakar-Niger Railway.

See also 
 Railway stations in Senegal
 Railway stations in Mali

References 

Mali–Senegal border crossings
Populated places in Senegal